Vaiyampatti block is a revenue block in the Tiruchirappalli district of Tamil Nadu, India. It has a total of 18 panchayat villages. Region of Cauvery Delta in Chola Nadu.

References 

 

Revenue blocks of Tiruchirappalli district